Themodmin is a training and software development technology company that started as an international architecture and design firm back in 2012 and shift towards architecture software consulting on the beginning of 2016 it founded by Mohammed Majdi Hamada, with its main office situated in Cyberjaya , Malaysia.

Architectural work

Conceptual projects
WINMAO (2014), Malacca Malaysia
TheModmin-School of Architecture (2013), Cyberjaya Malaysia
TheModmin Office (2013), Putrajaya Malaysia
Elysium Titiwangsa Youth Center (2012), Kuala Lumpur, Malaysia
The Millenium Archives Art Gallery (2012), Kuala Lumpur, Malaysia

Ongoing and future projects

Chevrolet car showroom (2014), Tripoli Libya
Zuwara Stadium (2013), Zuwara Libya

References

Architecture